Rixton is the former name of British pop rock duo Push Baby.

Rixton may also refer to:

 Hollins Green, a village in Warrington, Cheshire, England; also known as Rixton, from the full parish name of Rixton-with-Glazebrook
 Rixton-with-Glazebrook, a civil parish in the unitary authority of Warrington, Cheshire, England
 Rixton Clay Pits, former clay extraction site in Rixton, near Hollins Green

See also
 Roxton (disambiguation)